Henriette Catherine de Joyeuse  (8 January 1585 – 25 February 1656) was the daughter of Henri de Joyeuse and Catherine de Nogaret de La Valette. She married her first husband, Henri de Bourbon, Duke of Montpensier, on 15 May 1597 and her second husband, Charles, Duke of Guise, on 6 January 1611.

Marriages and children 
From her first marriage to Henri de Bourbon she had one child:
 Marie de Bourbon, Duchess of Montpensier (15 October 1605 – 4 June 1627) who married Gaston Jean Baptiste de France, duc d'Orléans; parents of la Grande Mademoiselle

From her second marriage to Charles, Duke of Guise she had ten children:

 François de Lorraine (April 3, 1612 – December 7, 1639)
 Twin boys, who were very frail and sickly. They died on the same day.
 Henri de Lorraine, Duke of Guise (1614–1664), also Archbishop of Reims
 Marie de Lorraine, Duchess of Guise (1615–1688)
 A girl, called Mademoiselle de Joinville, who was born healthy but caught a cold in the winter of 1617 and died shortly thereafter.
 Charles Louis de Lorraine (July 15, 1618 – March 15, 1637, Florence), styled Duke of Joyeuse 
Louis de Lorraine, Duke of Joyeuse  (1622–1664), also Duke of Angoulême
 Françoise Renée de Lorraine (January 10, 1621 – December 4, 1682, Montmartre), Abbess of Montmartre
 Roger de Lorraine (March 21, 1624 – September 9, 1653)

References 
 familysearch.org Accessed July 22, 2007
 thepeerage.com Accessed July 22, 2007

Henriette Catherine
1585 births
1656 deaths
French suo jure nobility
Henriette Catherine
Henriette Catherine
Countesses of Eu
Henriette Catherine
Henriette Catherine
Henriette Catherine
Henriette Catherine
French duchesses
16th-century French women
17th-century French women